Yeoryiós Vamvakas (born 1 January 1960) is a Greek hurdler. He competed in the men's 400 metres hurdles at the 1984 Summer Olympics.

References

1960 births
Living people
Athletes (track and field) at the 1984 Summer Olympics
Greek male hurdlers
Olympic athletes of Greece
Place of birth missing (living people)